Nanda Saukhya Bhare is a Marathi language television drama series that aired on Zee Marathi. The show premiered from 20 July 2015 which is produced by Aadesh Bandekar under the banner of Soham Productions.

Cast

Main 
 Rutuja Bagwe as Swanandi Deshpande / Swanandi Indranil Jahagirdar
 Chinmay Udgirkar as Indranil Jahagirdar (Neel)

Recurring 
 Reshma Shinde as Sampada Deshpande
 Suhas Paranjape as Lalita Jahagirdar
 Akshata Naik as Nilima Jahagirdar
 Varsha Dandale as Vatsala (Vacchi)
 Uma Gokhale as Swanandi's mother
 Yogesh Soman as Swanandi's father
 Prajakta Gaikwad as Sayali Deshpande
 Vijay Patwardhan as Swanandi's uncle
 Rugvedi Pradhan as Swanandi's aunt
 Ragini Samant as Swanandi's grandmother

Reception 
The series premiered from Monday to Saturday at 7.30 pm by replacing Ase He Kanyadan.

Special episode

1 hour 
 30 August 2015
 27 September 2015
 25 October 2015
 14 February 2016

2 hours 
 13 December 2015 (Neel-Swanandi's marriage)

Ratings

References

External links 
  
 Nanda Saukhya Bhare at ZEE5

Marathi-language television shows
Zee Marathi original programming
2015 Indian television series debuts
2016 Indian television series endings